Grace Church, Mt. Airy (Grace Epiphany Church) is an historic Episcopal church, which is located at 224 East Gowen Avenue in the Mount Airy neighborhood of Philadelphia, Pennsylvania.

It was added to the National Register of Historic Places in 1998.

History and architectural features
The church, its parish house and a rectory were designed by Charles M. Burns and built in 1888. Burns also designed the Church of the Advocate in Philadelphia.

A school was added in 1962.

The three original buildings were added to the National Register of Historic Places in 1998.

Rectors
In the Episcopal Church in the United States of America, the rector is the priest elected to head a self-supporting parish.
The Rev. G. A. Redles (1874-1875)
The Rev. Simeon Hill (1875-1912)
The Rev. Thomas Sparks Cline (1913-1924)
The Rev. Charles E. Eder (1925-1958) 
The Rev. Richard K. Bauder (1959-1989)

References

External links
Official site
Witness to Grace: A History of Grace Church, Mt. Airy (1857-1988)
History of Twenty-Five Years in Grace Church, Mt. Airy

Properties of religious function on the National Register of Historic Places in Philadelphia
Churches completed in 1888
19th-century churches in the United States
Churches in Philadelphia
Mount Airy, Philadelphia
Churches on the National Register of Historic Places in Pennsylvania
Episcopal churches in Pennsylvania
19th-century Episcopal church buildings
Philadelphia Register of Historic Places